Daniel Henry Rothschild (born 1979) is an American philosopher and Head of University College London Department of Philosophy. He is known for his expertise on philosophy of language. Rothschild has held various fellowships from the Arts and Humanities Research Council and is a Fifty-Pound fellow of All Souls College.

References

External links
Personal Website
Daniel Rothschild at UCL
Daniel Rothschild, Google Scholar

21st-century American philosophers
Philosophers of language
Philosophy academics
Princeton University alumni
Yale University alumni
Living people
1979 births
Philosophy journal editors
Academics of University College London
Columbia University faculty
Analytic philosophers
Semanticists